Life Is Going On and On is the thirteenth studio album by Japanese singer Misia. It was released on December 26, 2018, through Ariola Japan.

Commercial performance
Life Is Going On and On entered the Oricon Albums Chart at number 5. It peaked on the daily chart at number 3 on January 13, 2019. The album debuted at number 6 on the weekly Oricon Albums Chart, with sales of 16,000 copies, and reached its peak rank of number 5 the following week, selling 11,000 copies. The album also charted on the newly minted Oricon Combined Albums Chart, where it also peaked at number 5 on its second charting week. The album has currently spent four weeks within the top twenty and sold a combined (physical albums and downloads) total of 44,000 copies.

Track listing

Charts

References

External links
 

2018 albums
Misia albums
Ariola Japan albums
Albums produced by Seiji Kameda
Albums produced by her0ism
Albums produced by Shirō Sagisu